Geoffrey Francis Uvedale Udal (23 February 1908 – 5 December 1980) was an English cricketer.

Udal was born in Holborn, London on 23 February 1908. He played once as a right-handed batsman and an opening right-arm fast bowler  for Middlesex in 1932, while serving in the RAF. He later represented Leicestershire in three matches in 1946. He was found to be suffering from a broken rib during his Leicestershire appearances and played no subsequent first-class cricket. Udal died in Frimley, Surrey on 5 December 1980, at the age of 72.

His grandfather John Udal as Attorney-General in Fiji and did much to encourage cricket there. His grandson Shaun Udal has represented Hampshire, Middlesex and England.

External links
 Cricinfo profile
 Cricket Archive

1908 births
1980 deaths
English cricketers
Leicestershire cricketers
Middlesex cricketers
Royal Air Force cricketers